The 2017–18 Cypriot Third Division is the 47th season of the Cypriot third-level football league.

Format
Sixteen teams participated in the 2017–18 Cypriot Third Division. All teams will play against each other twice, once at their home and once away. The team with the most points at the end of the season crowned champions. The first three teams were promoted to the 2017–18 Cypriot Second Division and the last three teams were relegated to the 2017–18 STOK Elite Division.

Point system
Teams received three points for a win, one point for a draw and zero points for a loss.

Changes from previous season
Teams promoted to 2017–18 Cypriot Second Division
 P.O. Xylotymbou
 Digenis Oroklinis
 Chalkanoras

Teams relegated from 2016–17 Cypriot Second Division
 Akritas
 ENAD
 Parekklisia

Teams promoted from 2016–17 STOK Elite Division
 Onisilos Sotira 2014
 APEA Akrotiriou
 Finikas
 Elpida Astromeriti

Teams relegated to 2017–18 STOK Elite Division
 Iraklis Gerolakkou
 Elpida Xylofagou
 AEN

Stadia and locations

League standings

Results

Sources

See also
 Cypriot Third Division
 2017–18 Cypriot First Division
 2017–18 Cypriot Second Division
 2017–18 Cypriot Cup for lower divisions

References

Cypriot Third Division seasons
Cyprus
2017–18 in Cypriot football